Demokracija is a Slovenian right-wing weekly news and political magazine published in Ljubljana, Slovenia. It has been in circulation since 1990.

History and profile
Demokracija was founded in January 1990 as a dissident and pro-Spring magazine. The magazine is published weekly on Thursdays. Its headquarters is in Ljubljana. 

Demokracija has a right-wing and conservative stance. In its early days the weekly was considered to be close to the Slovenian Democratic Union. Then it is considered to have links with the Slovenian Democratic Party (SDS).

The magazine focuses on political news in Slovenia and in the world, but also covers sections about history, culture, film, sports and entertainment.

In July 2017, Ripost, a Hungarian media company, acquired a majority share in Demokracija's parent company, Nova obzorja. Ripost has deep ties to the ruling political party in Hungary and Prime Minister Viktor Orbán. The Slovenian Democratic Party has retained a 42% share in the parent company. Ripost is also a significant shareholder in another media company tied to SDS, Nova24TV.

See also
 List of magazines in Slovenia

References

External links

1990 establishments in Slovenia
Conservatism in Slovenia
Conservative magazines
Magazines established in 1990
Mass media in Ljubljana
News magazines published in Europe
Political magazines published in Slovenia
Slovene-language magazines
Weekly news magazines